Niagara Falls Memorial Medical Center is a hospital in downtown Niagara Falls in the state of New York, founded in 1895, that has been serving the Greater Niagara region for over 100 years.

History
The hospital began as a small emergency hospital in 1895 to serve the Niagara Falls region and has since evolved into a full-service, 171-bed medical center consisting of all-private rooms offering inpatient and outpatient services including:
The Heart Center of Niagara
Diabetes & Endocrinology Center of Niagara
University Sports Medicine of Niagara.

Memorial is Niagara's safety net hospital for the medically underserved, uninsured and underinsured, annually providing some $6.5 million in uncompensated and charity care.  It was the first hospital in Niagara to be accredited as a stroke center by the New York State Department of Health.

Memorial operate several satellite facilities including the Summit Healthplex and Tuscarora Health Center as well as the Schoellkopf Health Center, a 120-bed skilled nursing facility that features 100-percent private room accommodations and specializes in short-term rehabilitation and elder care.

Memorial's Child Advocacy Center of Niagara enjoys national accreditation.

As one of the Greater Niagara region's largest employers, Niagara Falls Memorial plays an active role as an economic engine and a catalyst for community growth.  Since 2003, Memorial has made $62 million in capital improvements to its downtown Niagara Falls campus.

Programs offered
Wellness Programs:
 Community Health Worker Program
 Niagara Health Home
 Project Runway
 CPR Classes
 Cardiac Rehabilitation
 Pulmonary Rehabilitation
 Living with Diabetes
       Breastfeeding Support Group
       Parkinson's Disease Support Group
       Breast Cancer Support Group
       Bariatric Surgery Support Group

Childbirth and Parenting Education Programs:
 Childbirth Classes
 Breastfeeding Classes

Speakers Bureau—Community Presentations

The Family Medicine Residency Program
The Family Medicine Residency Program has been in existence for 30 years and was founded by Dr. Melvin B. Dyster, M.D., who was active in the program until he died in April 2021.  It is affiliated with the Lake Erie College of Osteopathic Medicine and operates under the direction of Jeffrey O. Burnett, D.O.

Family Medicine is the only residency program Memorial offers.  The program's faculty members are interested in research and have published in the areas of patient safety, residency training and working with underserved populations.

At Niagara Falls Memorial, residents work closely with board certified physicians and faculty members.  In addition to completing clinical rotations at the medical center, residents use the center's mobile clinic to provide care to migrant workers at nearby farms.  They also see patients on an outpatient basis at Memorial's Summit Family Health Center, the Niagara University Health Clinic and the Tuscarora Indian Reservation Health Center.

Accreditation
The Medical Center is accredited by the Healthcare Facilities Accreditation Program. The Intersocietal Accreditation Commission has accredited the "Adult Transthoracic Echocardiography and Adult Stress Echocardiography."  The American Association of Cardiovascular and Pulmonary Rehabilitation has accredited the center for Cardiac Rehabilitation.  In addition, the American College of Radiology has accredited the center for:
Magnetic Resonance Imaging (MRI) – Summit Healthplex
Computerized Tomography (CT) – The Heart Center of Niagara
Computerized Tomography (CT) – Summit Healthplex
Nuclear Medicine – The Heart Center of Niagara
Nuclear Medicine – Summit Healthplex
Mammography – Memorial Medical Center
Mammography – Summit Healthplex

References

External links
 The Heart Center

Hospitals established in 1895
Hospitals in New York (state)
Niagara Falls, New York
1895 establishments in New York (state)